Metanauplius is an early larval stage of some crustaceans such as krill. It follows the nauplius stage.

In sac-spawning krill, there is an intermediary phase called pseudometanauplius, a newly hatched form distinguished from older metanauplii by its extremely short abdomen. In some species, this form is not considered a separate developmental stage as it develops into a metanauplius without molting; in other species such as Nyctiphanes couchii, it can be separated from the metanauplius stage by the molt of a very thin cuticle soon after hatching.

Broadcast-spawning species of krill do not have a pseudometanauplius stage. They generally hatch in the nauplius 1 stage, but recently have been discovered to hatch sometimes as metanauplius or even as calyptopis stages.

See also
Crustacean larvae

Footnotes

References

Crustaceans
Krill
Larvae